Curt Hansen (born September 18, 1964, in Bov, Sønderjylland) is a Danish chess grandmaster and a former World Junior Champion. He is a six-time Danish Champion.

Chess career
A strong junior player, Hansen had major successes in international youth competitions, commencing with the then Groningen-based European Junior Chess Championship, where he finished first in 1982 and second in 1983. The next year, he became the World Junior Champion in Kiljava, ahead of Alexei Dreev and beating the defending champion Kiril Georgiev, and was awarded the International Master title. In 1985, he became a Grandmaster after earning the necessary norms.

In domestic chess, he succeeded Bent Larsen as Denmark's strongest player and between 1983 and 2000 won the Danish Championship six times. By 1992, his rating had reached 2600 and later the same year rose to 2635, giving him his best ever ranking, tied for 14th place on the FIDE list.

Hansen has represented his country five times at the Olympiad between 1984 and 2000, always playing  and always scoring in excess of 50%. He was twice shared winner at the traditional Sigeman & Co. tournament in Malmö, in 1994 (with Ferdinand Hellers) and in 2004 (with Peter Heine Nielsen), ahead of Magnus Carlsen and Alexander Beliavsky. His list of international tournament successes also includes outright or shared first places at Borgarnes 1984, Vejstrup 1989 (ahead of Ian Rogers, including all three Polgar sisters in a round robin of ten players), Groningen 1991, Tastrup 1992, Aalborg 1994, Vejle 1994, and Reykjavík Zonal 1995.

As of November 2009, Hansen had an Elo rating of 2619, making him Denmark's second-ranking player, although he has rarely played since 2006.

Notes

References

External links
 
 
 

1964 births
Living people
People from Aabenraa Municipality
Chess grandmasters
Chess double grandmasters
Chess Olympiad competitors
Danish chess players
World Junior Chess Champions